William Harker (21 December 1910 – 1973) was an English professional association footballer who played as an inside forward for several teams in the Football League.

References

1910 births
Year of death missing
People from Brierfield, Lancashire
English footballers
Association football forwards
Nelson F.C. players
Burnley F.C. players
Torquay United F.C. players
Accrington Stanley F.C. (1891) players
Portsmouth F.C. players
Stockport County F.C. players
Rochdale A.F.C. players
English Football League players
Sportspeople from Lancashire